Guy A. Kistler (November 15, 1910 – February 16, 1988) is a former Republican member of the Pennsylvania House of Representatives.

References

1910 births
1988 deaths
Republican Party members of the Pennsylvania House of Representatives
20th-century American politicians